Thomas William Spencer  (22 March 1914 – 1 November 1995)  was a London-born English first-class cricketer and international umpire. He played 76 matches for Kent either side of World War 2 as an attacking batsman before moving into coaching at Wrekin School. A natural sportman, he also turned out for Fulham, Lincoln City and Walsall at football and claimed to have played four sports professionally, the others being table tennis and boxing.  For many years he wintered coaching in South Africa.

At Frank Chester's suggestion he joined the first-class umpire's list in 1950 and was appointed to his first Test in 1954. For reasons he never understood he had to wait 15 years before he was asked again. "I was a bit disgusted," he told the Northern Echo years later, "but I was determined to plod on and become a bloody good county umpire."  He eventually stood in 17 Test matches (the last in 1978) and six ODIs including the first at Lord's in 1972 and the first World Cup final in 1975. For the last 20 years until his retirement in 1980 he travelled to matches by train rather than car which he said allowed him to rest his eyes between appointments.  In all, he stood in a record 570 County Championship matches and 701 first-class fixtures, a total second only to Chester.

His death in 1995 was reported in the local media in the North East, where he had lived for many years, but overlooked in the wider cricketing world. His obituary did not appear in Wisden or The Cricketer until 2003.

See also
 List of Test cricket umpires
 List of One Day International cricket umpires

References

External links
 

1914 births
1995 deaths
English Test cricket umpires
English One Day International cricket umpires
Kent cricketers
English cricketers
Officers of the Order of the British Empire